Nelson Alejandro Cereceda Cabello (born 8 August 1991) was a Chilean professional footballer who plays as a right-back.

Honours
Colo-Colo
 Primera División de Chile: 2009 Clausura

References
 
 

1991 births
Living people
Chilean footballers
Association football fullbacks
Chilean Primera División players
Primera B de Chile players
Colo-Colo footballers
Deportes Copiapó footballers
Deportes Temuco footballers